Blaz Lomovsek (born December 24, 1956) is a former Yugoslav ice hockey player. He played for the Yugoslavia men's national ice hockey team at the 1984 Winter Olympics in Sarajevo.

References

External links

1956 births
Living people
KHL Medveščak Zagreb players
HDD Olimpija Ljubljana players
HK Partizan players
Ice hockey players at the 1984 Winter Olympics
Olympic ice hockey players of Yugoslavia
Slovenian ice hockey centres
Sportspeople from Ljubljana
Yugoslav ice hockey centres